George A. Grayer (May 10, 1894 – death date unknown) was an American Negro league first baseman in the 1920s.

A native of Baltimore, Maryland, Grayer played for the Baltimore Black Sox in 1920 and 1921. In 11 recorded games, he posted eight hits and five RBI in 40 plate appearances.

References

External links
Baseball statistics and player information from Baseball-Reference Black Baseball Stats and Seamheads

1894 births
Year of death missing
Place of death missing
Baltimore Black Sox players
Baseball first basemen
Baseball players from Baltimore